Pickens County is a county located on the west central border of the U.S. state of Alabama. As of the 2020 census, the population was 19,123. Its county seat is Carrollton, located in the center of the county. It is a prohibition, or dry county, although the communities of Carrollton and Aliceville voted to become wet in 2011 and 2012, respectively.

Pickens County is included in the Tuscaloosa, AL Metropolitan Statistical Area

History
Like the rest of Alabama, this had long been occupied by Native Americans; historically the Muscogee people (Creek) dominated this area. Pickens County was established on the western border of Alabama on December 20, 1820, and named for revolutionary war hero General Andrew Pickens of South Carolina. The county seat was relocated from Pickensville to Carrollton in 1830.

Less than one-third of the county was developed for cotton plantations, which were worked by enslaved African-Americans brought south by northern businessmen interested in cheap cotton. These plantations were developed primarily in the southernmost reaches of the county, in the lowlands along the banks of the Tombigbee River and stretching over a small prairie-like area. The rest of the county was settled by yeomen farmers who held  few slaves; it was topographically unsuited for plantation-scale farming operations.

During the American Civil War, the first courthouse in Carrollton was burned on April 5, 1865, by troops of Union General John T. Croxton. Recovering from that and other damage was part of the postwar work for the county.

A second courthouse was built in Carrollton. It was destroyed by fire on November 16, 1876, during the last months of the Reconstruction era. Though arson was suspected, no arrest was made until January 1878, after white Democrats had regained control of the state legislature and the county sheriff's office. White racial hostility toward African Americans in the county, and their efforts to retain dominance, resulted in numerous lynchings.

According to the third edition of Lynching in America, a study of lynchings of African Americans in the United States, the county had 14 documented lynchings of African Americans in Pickens County from 1877 to 1917; this is the fifth-highest total in the state. This was the period of Jim Crow and disenfranchisement of blacks throughout Alabama and the South.

Henry Wells, an African American, was arrested in January 1878 as a suspect in the courthouse arson and a burglary. He was captured in an arrest for the burglary, in which he was shot and wounded. Reportedly confessing to the courthouse arson (likely under coercion), he died five days later of his wounds. A myth associated his death with another lynching of an African-American man in this period, and an image, purportedly of Wells' face in a courthouse window. But while numerous African Americans were lynched in the courthouse square, the windows in the courthouse were not installed until February and March 1878.

In the late 19th century, there was strong hostility in Pickens County among yeomen whites against freedmen, and they committed numerous lynchings into the early 20th century. The county was a populist stronghold in the 1890s and many voters had joined the Farmers Alliance. Agricultural commissioner and populist choice Reuben F. Kolb was defeated in 1890 for the Democratic nomination for governor by Thomas G. Jones, chosen by delegates who joined to defeat Kolb. In 1892 both ran again, Kolb representing Jeffersonian Democrats, and Kolb the main Democratic Party. Kolb won in Pickens County by "an immense majority". Governor Jones was re-elected, in part because of his reliance on a platform of white supremacy, to appeal to whites alarmed by Kolb's promising to protect African-American rights. But Jones supported reform, opposing the convict lease system that trapped so many African Americans in near-slavery conditions.

Electoral unrest and populist furor in the county may have contributed to six lynchings in Carrollton in the fall of 1893. On September 14, 1893, African-American suspects Paul Archer, Will Archer, Emma Fair, Ed Guyton, and Paul Hill, were each shot to death in a mass lynching by a white mob at the courthouse jail. They had been arrested when accused of burning a mill and cotton gin owned by a white man. Their lynchings followed that of Joe Floyd, another African-American worker, two weeks before.

On August 28, 1907, African-American John Gibson was lynched in Carrollton, hanged to death in the courthouse square. John Lipsep was hanged and shot in early September 1907, a suspect in an attack on a white woman.

20th century to present
From 1940 to 1970, many African Americans left Pickens County to escape racial violence and oppression in the Great Migration to urban areas, as did other rural residents, because of lack of economic opportunity.

On April 8, 1998, a supercell thunderstorm produced an F3 tornado in Pickens County. This windstorm injured two people and damaged five homes including mobile homes. It rotated  from Holman to north of Northport. Twenty-four homes and thirteen mobile homes were also in the path of destruction. Moments later, that same supercell thunderstorm produced an F5 tornado that struck northeastern Tuscaloosa near the Black Warrior River before entering western Jefferson County where it destroyed Oak Grove High School and killed thirty-two people in its path.

From 2000 to 2013 the county was again losing population. From July 2013 to July 2014, the population grew by 5.1%, making it the fourth-fastest growing county with at least 10,000 inhabitants. In 2014 it became the fastest-growing county in Alabama. But part of the growth was the result of the construction here of the Federal Correctional Institution, Aliceville federal women's prison. Prisoners are included in local census numbers, as are prison employees, some of whom came from other counties.

In 2016, Black disabled veteran Sean Worsley was arrested in Pickens County for possession of prescription medical marijuana by Police Officer Carl Abramo of the Gordo Police Department. Worsley was arrested after stopping at a gas station when Abramo allegedly heard loud music and "observed a black male get out of the passenger side vehicle". In 2020, Mr. Worsley was extradited from his home state in Arizona to Pickens County, where he was sentenced by a judge to 60 months in the custody of the Alabama Department of Corrections.

In 2019, Sheriff David Abston resigned as part of a plea deal with federal officials. He pleaded guilty to scamming a local food bank and his own church for food to feed county prisoners. He then was able to pocket the savings. Abston had served in the office for more than thirty years.

Geography

The county is between Tuscaloosa County and the Alabama-Mississippi state line.

Adjacent counties
Lamar County (north)
Fayette County (northeast)
Tuscaloosa County (east)
Greene County (southeast)
Sumter County (south)
Noxubee County, Mississippi (southwest)
Lowndes County, Mississippi (west)

Transportation

Major highways
 U.S. Highway 82
 State Route 14
 State Route 17
 State Route 32
 State Route 86
 State Route 159

Rail
Alabama and Gulf Coast Railway
Alabama Southern Railroad

Demographics

2020 census

As of the 2020 United States census, there were 19,123 people, 7,637 households, and 5,074 families residing in the county.

2010 census
As of the 2010 United States census, there were 19,746 people in the county. 56.3% were White, 41.6% Black or African American, 0.2% Asian, 0.1% Native American, 0.6% of some other race and 1.2% of two or more races. 1.6% were Hispanic or Latino (of any race).

2000 census
As of the census of 2000, there were 20,949 people, 8,086 households, and 5,789 families residing in the county. The population density was 24 people per square mile (9/km2). There were 9,520 housing units at an average density of 11 per square mile (4/km2). The racial makeup of the county was 55.95% White, 42.96% Black or African American, 0.12% Native American, 0.11% Asian, 0.02% Pacific Islander, 0.22% from other races, and 0.63% from two or more races. About 0.70% of the population were Hispanic or Latino.

There were 8,086 households, out of which 32.60% had children under the age of 18 living with them, 49.80% were married couples living together, 18.20% had a female householder with no husband present, and 28.40% were non-families. Nearly 26.40% of all households were made up of individuals, and 12.50% had someone living alone who was 65 years of age or older. The average household size was 2.56, and the average family size was 3.11.

In the county, the population was spread out, with 27.30% under the age of 18, 8.50% from 18 to 24, 25.80% from 25 to 44, 22.80% from 45 to 64, and 15.70% who were 65 years of age or older. The median age was 37 years. For every 100 females, there were 88.10 males. For every 100 females age 18 and over, there were 83.30 males.

The median income for a household in the county was $26,254, and the median income for a family was $32,938. Males had a median income of $28,843 versus $20,569 for females. The per capita income for the county was $13,746. About 20.10% of families and 24.90% of the population were below the poverty line, including 34.30% of those under age 18 and 22.30% of those age 65 or over.

Government

Communities

Cities
Aliceville
Reform

Towns
Carrollton (county seat)
Ethelsville
Gordo
McMullen
Memphis
Pickensville

Census-designated places
Macedonia

Unincorporated communities
Beards Mill
Benevola
Coal Fire
Cochrane
Dancy
Liberty
Lubbub
McShan
Olney
Palmetto
Sapps
Vienna
Zion

See also
National Register of Historic Places listings in Pickens County, Alabama
Properties on the Alabama Register of Landmarks and Heritage in Pickens County, Alabama

Notes

References
.

External links
 Genealogical and Historical Web Site
 Pickens County map of roads/towns (map © 2007 Univ. of Alabama).
Pickens County article, Encyclopedia of Alabama
Pickens County, Alabama Sheriff's Office

 
1820 establishments in Alabama
Populated places established in 1820
Counties of Appalachia